WRNR may refer to:

 WRNR (AM), a radio station (740 AM) licensed to serve Martinsville, West Virginia, United States
 WRHS (FM), a radio station (101.1 FM) licensed to serve Grasonville, Maryland, United States, which held the call sign WRNR-FM from 1994 to 2023